Cryptochrostis is a genus of moths of the family Erebidae. The genus was erected by Jacob Hübner in 1823.

Species
Cryptochrostis crocea (Walker, [1867]) Colombia, Costa Rica
Cryptochrostis duquefi Barbut, 2007 French Guiana
Cryptochrostis suppulchraria Hübner, [1823] Suriname, Brazil (Rio de Janeiro)
Cryptochrostis deilinias (Schaus, 1921) Guatemala, Venezuela
Cryptochrostis flavala (Hampson, 1926) Guyana

References

Calpinae